The Hugh Wilson Hill House, also known as the Kelly-Stone-Hill House, is a historic house in Carrollton, Pickens County, Alabama. It is one of only a few surviving antebellum structures remaining in the town.  Architectural historians believe that the one-story Greek Revival-style house was built for Isham and Elizabeth Kelly during the late 1830s or 1840s.  Confederate general John Herbert Kelly grew up in the house.   It was added to the National Register of Historic Places on April 13, 1989.  It was listed as one of Alabama's "Places in Peril" for 2010 by the Alabama Historical Commission and Alabama Trust for Historic Preservation.

References

National Register of Historic Places in Pickens County, Alabama
Greek Revival houses in Alabama
Houses on the National Register of Historic Places in Alabama
Houses in Pickens County, Alabama